Zhenning River is a  river in downtown Zhenning Buyei and Miao Autonomous County and is a tributary of Guijia River. The river rises in Boluo Village of Shuanglongshan Subdistrict, and flows generally west through Shuanglong Subdistrict, Baimahu Subdistrict and Huancui Subdistrict, where it flows into the Guijia River in Guozhai Village.

References

 

Rivers of Guizhou
Zhenning Buyei and Miao Autonomous County